Cary is a village located in Algonquin Township, McHenry County, Illinois, and Cuba Township, Lake County, Illinois, United States. Per the 2020 census, the population was 17,826.

Founding
In 1841, William Dennison Cary purchased  for $1.25 an acre at the location of the current town and built a farm. In 1856, Cary included a train station for the Illinois & Wisconsin Railway which connected Cary to Chicago and Janesville. The site was approved and a post office was added with the designation "Cary Station." The community around Cary Station was incorporated in 1893 as Cary, Illinois. The town soon became a winter resort for skiing.

Early farmers saw this new railway as an opportunity.  The economy relied heavily on selling produce, mainly pickles, and the farmers utilized the railway to conduct business with more industrialized cities such as St. Louis and Chicago.  The success of this transportation enterprise helped transform Cary into the suburban community it is today. People traveled by rail and most commerce became dependent on the railroad.

In the 1950s, highway transportation overtook rail as the primary means of moving people and goods. Northwest Highway (U.S. 14) parallels the railroad right-of-way, which has been the Union Pacific Northwest Metra line since the Union Pacific merged with the Chicago & Northwestern in 1995.

Geography
Cary is located at  (42.2129566, -88.2483260).

It is located on the Fox River.

Demographics

2020 census

The population of Cary was 17,826 as of 2020.

There were 6,424 households, out of which 2838 had children under the age of 18 living with them.

The median income for a household in the village was $100,339, and the median income for a family was $111,065.

Education
Cary is mainly served by Community High School District 155 for high school students, specifically by Cary-Grove High School and Prairie Ridge High School, and School District 26 for elementary and middle school students. Some portions of Cary also are served by Crystal Lake Community Consolidated School District 47 and Community Unit School District 300.

Trinity Oaks Christian Academy, a non-denominational Christian school, is located in Cary, as well as Saints Peter and Paul, a Roman Catholic school and parish.

Popular culture
The interior of the bed and breakfast room that Bill Murray's character stays in, in the 1993 film Groundhog Day, was built in a warehouse in Cary.

Suzanne Evenson of Cary was featured on HGTV's show House Hunters International on December 8, 2010, showcasing her family's move from Cary to Dubai.

Students from the class of 2004 were featured in the MTV show High School Stories.  They concocted a senior prank which included launching a boat onto a pond on school property.

In the summer of 2016, Burger King opened its first ever drive-thru only restaurant in Cary.

A Cary resident, Chris Rudolph, was a contestant on TLC's "Spouse House," airing in July 2017.

Transportation
U.S. Route 14, locally known as Northwest Highway, passes through Cary between its northwest and southeast borders.

Illinois Route 31 forms part of Cary's western border.

Metra's Union Pacific/Northwest Line has a station in Cary and operates daily service to Ogilvie Transportation Center in downtown Chicago.

Lake in the Hills Airport is approximately two miles west of Cary's west border.

Notable people
Drew Conner, professional soccer player.
A. J. Raebel, Canadian football player.
Michael Glasder, ski jumper XXIII Olympic Winter Games (raised in Cary)
Quinn Priester, MLB baseball player, Pittsburgh Pirates pitcher, (attended Cary-Grove High School)
Jimmy John Liautaud, founder of Jimmy John's.
Alex Brettin, lead singer of psychedelic pop group Mild High Club.

References

External links

 

1841 establishments in Illinois
Chicago metropolitan area
Populated places established in 1841
Villages in Illinois
Villages in McHenry County, Illinois